Schinia brunnea is a moth of the family Noctuidae first described by William Barnes and James Halliday McDunnough in 1913. It is found in the desert areas west of the Peninsular Ranges and south of the Transverse Ranges of southern California in the US.

Adults are on wing from late summer to early fall.

External links
Revision of the tertia species complex

Schinia
Moths of North America
Moths described in 1913